MTS Oceanos was a French-built and Greek-owned cruise ship that sank in 1991 when she suffered uncontrolled flooding. Her captain, Yiannis Avranas, and some of the crew were convicted of negligence for fleeing the ship without helping the passengers, who were subsequently rescued thanks to the efforts of the ship's entertainers, who made a mayday transmission, launched lifeboats and helped South African Marines land on the ship from naval helicopters. All 571 passengers and crew survived.

Epirotiki Lines had lost two other ships within the three years preceding the sinking: the company's flagship Pegasus only two months before, and MV Jupiter, three years before.

History
Oceanos was launched in July 1952 by Forges et Chantiers de la Gironde in Bordeaux, France as Jean Laborde, the last of four sister ships built for Messageries Maritimes. The ships were used on the Marseilles – Madagascar – Mauritius service. Jean Laborde went through many different owners and name changes (Jean Laborde, Mykinai, Ancona, Eastern Princess) in the succeeding decades. In 1976, she was acquired by Epirotiki Lines of Greece and registered under the name of Oceanos.

Oceanos was briefly featured in the 1985 film Sky High and with another Epirotiki ship, Apollon XI, in the 1986 film Hardbodies 2.

Final voyage

Under charter by TFC Tours, Oceanos  initially delayed by a bomb threat  set out from East London, South Africa on 3 August 1991, and headed for Durban. Captain Yiannis Avranas (born  1940) had been an officer for twenty years and a seaman for thirty. Oceanos headed into 40-knot winds and  swells. Usually, there would have been a "sail-away" party on deck. However, rough seas caused the party to be held inside in the Four Seasons lounge; most passengers chose to stay in their cabins.

While trying to make up lost time, Oceanos encountered rough seas. The storm worsened as the evening progressed and when the first sitting of dinner was served, the waiters could hardly carry the trays of food without dropping something.

Flooding
Earlier repairs to the waste disposal system had not been completed, which meant that a vital ventilation pipe which ran through the watertight aft bulkhead and the non-return valves were not replaced. It is believed that after a series of freak waves slammed against the ship, the pipe's shell plating burst open and began filling the compartment with seawater. At about 9:30p.m., a muffled explosion was heard and Oceanos lost power. The ship started taking on water, rapidly flooding the engine room.

Once the engines stopped, the ship began to roll so badly that in the lounge, where passengers gathered, crockery and cutlery began sliding off the tables and potted plants fell over.

No alarm or announcement had been given that the ship was in trouble; with other entertainers working on the cruise, Moss Hills a musician from Zimbabwe and former member of Four Jacks and a Jill who had been performing with his wife Tracy in the lounge, explored below decks, discovered that Oceanos appeared to be sinking, and were informed by the cruise director, Lorraine Betts, that the captain had given the order to abandon ship and some crew had already left in a lifeboat. They began launching the remaining lifeboats, with up to 90 people in each, but were unable to start their engines. When the ship's worsening list to starboard made it unsafe to continue, Hills and several passengers went to the bridge to look for the crew, but found it unmanned. They used the radio phone to broadcast a mayday distress call until Moss received a response.

By the next morning rescuers found Oceanos adrift just off Coffee Bay, on the Wild Coast.

Rescue efforts
Two small ships in the vicinity were first on the scene, and provided the ship's coordinates to the South African authorities. Rescue helicopters began arriving three hours later, and winched passengers and remaining crew to safety, with Hills continuing in charge of the orderly evacuation. Thirteen of the sixteen were South African Air Force Pumas, nine of which hoisted 225 passengers off the deck. They were assisted by the lifeboats of the Dutch cargo ship Nedlloyd Mauritius, which had responded to the distress call. An inflatable had to be launched to rescue some passengers who panicked and jumped into the water.

Oceanos sank bow first approximately 45 minutes after the last person was airlifted from the deck. The final minutes of her sinking were captured on video and broadcast by ABC News. All 581 people on board were saved. Entertainment manager Robin Boltman was credited with gathering the passengers in the lounge and playing music to calm them. Among the entertainers onboard was the South African cabaret performer, Alvon Collison, who later reported that he had begun singing an impromptu repertoire as the ship was sinking, in an effort to keep the passengers' spirits up. In his characteristic style, he managed to weave a comical moment into his narrative of the tumultuous events, telling reporters that he had started singing "Bye Bye Miss American Pie", when he suddenly realised that the next line was going to be "This’ll be the day that I die" - and quickly switched to another song

Hills later said that searching for Captain Avranas, he had discovered him smoking on the fantail and he said "I think he was in deep, deep shock." Hills reportedly rescued Avranas' dog and released his canary. A South African Navy Diver testified that the captain had insisted on being taken ashore by the first helicopter. Boltman told a newspaper: "Later in the morning, Captain Avarnasi (sic) even contacted me from shore to ask how things were going."

Aftermath
Captain Avranas received extensive media coverage as an example of unprofessional behaviour whilst in command. He stated that he left the ship first to arrange for a rescue effort, and then supervised the rescue from a helicopter because "the batteries on the crew's walkie-talkies had died, meaning that he had no communications with his crew or with other rescue craft". He was quoted soon after the sinking as saying, "When I order abandon the ship, it doesn't matter what time I leave. Abandon is for everybody. If some people like to stay, they can stay." In 1992, he and five other officers were convicted of negligence by a Greek board of inquiry for fleeing the ship without helping the passengers.

Dateline NBC aired a documentary of the incident on 23 May 2010. The sinking is the subject of a song called "Oceanos" by Celtic rock band Coast. It was also discussed in an episode of Nova on 18 April 2012, entitled, "Why Ships Sink", which focused mainly on the Costa Concordia accident (whose commanding officer also fled while passengers were still aboard). Hills was interviewed in the special, and related that some years later he had been on board when the MS Achille Lauro of Star Lauro sank. The rescue featured in episode 4 of Shockwave, first aired 21 December 2007. The NPR radio show and podcast Snap Judgment featured an account of the sinking by Moss Hills. The show Extreme Weather: The Survivors featured a segment on the sinking. In 2022, Moss Hills – who later became a cruise director – was interviewed by Jane Garvey for BBC Radio 4's series Life Changing.

Wreck
Divers have visited her, but strong currents make the dive difficult. Photographs taken in 2002 show that the bridge section has collapsed.

See also

The captain goes down with the ship

References

Further reading

External links
The Oceanos Sinking, a website maintained by Moss Hills and Tracy Hills
 – Reprint of article originally published in 1991
Down With The Ship – NPR Snap Judgement episode #726 

1952 ships
1991 in South Africa
Sunken cruise ships
Maritime incidents involving cruise ships
Maritime incidents in 1991
Shipwrecks in the Indian Ocean
Maritime incidents in South Africa
Shipwrecks of the South African Indian Ocean coast
Ships sunk with no fatalities